The 1916 United States Senate election in Texas was held on November 7, 1916. Incumbent Democratic U.S. Senator Charles Culberson was re-elected to a fourth term in office. Culberson survived a challenge from former Governor Oscar Colquitt in the Democratic primary, then easily won the general election.

This was the first U.S. Senate election in Texas held after the passage of the Seventeenth Amendment, which required all Senators be elected by a direct popular vote.

Democratic primary

Candidates
S.P. Brooks
Thomas Mitchell Campbell, former Governor of Texas (1907–11)
Oscar Branch Colquitt, former Governor of Texas (1911–15)
Charles Allen Culberson, incumbent U.S. Senator since 1899
John Davis
Robert Lee Henry, U.S. Representative from Waco
G. W. Riddle

Results

Runoff

General election

Results

See also 
 1916 United States Senate elections

References

Texas
1916
Senate